The 1967 Cal State Hayward Pioneers football team represented California State College at Hayward—now known California State University, East Bay—as a member of the Far Western Conference (FWC) during the 1967 NCAA College Division football season. Led by second-year head coach Les Davis, Cal State Hayward compiled an overall record of 7–3 with a mark of 3–3 in conference play, placing fourth in the FWC. The team outscored its opponents 419 to 231 for the season. The Pioneers played home games at Pioneer Stadium in Hayward, California.

Schedule

Notes

References

Cal State Hayward
Cal State Hayward Pioneers football seasons
Cal State Hayward Pioneers football